Aleksandr Georgievich Gorshkov (8 October 1946 – 17 November 2022) was a Russian ice dancer who competed internationally for the Soviet Union. With his wife Lyudmila Pakhomova, he was the 1976 Olympic champion. 

They were also six-time World Champions (1970–74, 1976), as well as six-time European champions (1970–71, 1973–76), which makes them the most decorated athletes all-time at both events in the pair discipline.

Since 2010 and until his death, Gorshkov served as the president of the Figure Skating Federation of Russia (FFKKR).

Life and career 
Gorshkov was born on 8 October 1946. He began skating at age six after his mother heard that the Sokolniki skating school was taking new students. He was moved to the weakest group after a year but his mother brought him to a stronger one when a new coach took over.

In 1966, while at CSKA Moscow, he received an invitation from Lyudmila Pakhomova to skate with her. Since he had much less experience, some experts were skeptical of her choice. Despite the initial experience gap, Gorshkov said that Pakhomova was a strong personality who was determined they would become champions.

Pakhomova/Gorshkov began training in May 1966, under coach Elena Tchaikovskaia, and made their international debut in December of the same year. They competed for Dynamo. After teaming up, a personal relationship developed between the duo and Gorshkov proposed marriage; Pakhomova responded that they would marry only if they became World champions.

Pakhomova/Gorshkov performed in the ice dancing demonstration event at the 1968 Winter Olympics – the event determined if ice dancing would be added as an official Olympic sport and was successful. They won their first World title in 1970 and married later that year. The duo repeated as World champions in 1971, 1972, 1973, and 1974. In 1974, Pakhomova/Gorshkov and Tchaikovskaia created the Tango Romantica, which the ISU would later adopt as a compulsory dance.

Following the 1975 European Championships, Gorshkov began feeling ill and underwent a lung operation, with their coach Elena Tchaikovskaia donating blood. They flew to Colorado Springs, Colorado for the 1975 World Championships, unsure about their participation. During the first practice session, Gorshkov had trouble breathing and needed to be given oxygen – they withdrew from the event. In the Soviet Union, rumors circulated that Gorshkov had died on the flight to the United States and the chairman of the Soviet Sports Committee called him to check if he was still alive.

Pakhomova/Gorshkov returned to competition the following season. Ice dancing debuted as an official Olympic sport at the 1976 Winter Olympics in Innsbruck, Austria, and Pakhomova/Gorshkov became the first Olympic champions in the discipline. They won their sixth World title in 1976 in Goteburg, Sweden. They retired from competition later that year. In 1977, they had a daughter, Yulia Gorshkova.

Pakhomova died of leukemia on 17 May 1986. Gorshkov and his late wife were inducted into the World Figure Skating Hall of Fame in 1988.

Gorshkov later served as the chairman of the International Skating Union's ice dance technical committee. At an election conference held in Novogorsk on 4 June 2010, he was unanimously elected president of the Russian Figure Skating Federation. He was president of a Regional Public Charitable Foundation for the Arts and Sports named after Pakhomova.

Gorshkov later married Irina Ivanovna Gorshkova, with whom he has a stepson, Stanislav Belyaev.

On 17 November 2022, the director general of the Russian Figure Skating Federation, Alexander Kogan, announced that Gorshkov had died in Moscow that same day. He was 76.

Results 
(with Pakhomova)

References

External links

Navigation

1946 births
2022 deaths
Russian male ice dancers
Soviet male ice dancers
Dynamo sports society athletes
European Figure Skating Championships medalists
Figure skaters at the 1976 Winter Olympics
Figure skaters from Moscow
Medalists at the 1976 Winter Olympics
Olympic figure skaters of the Soviet Union
Olympic gold medalists for the Soviet Union
Olympic medalists in figure skating
World Figure Skating Championships medalists
Communist Party of the Soviet Union members
Honoured Masters of Sport of the USSR
Merited Coaches of the Soviet Union
Recipients of the Order "For Merit to the Fatherland", 3rd class
Recipients of the Order "For Merit to the Fatherland", 4th class
Recipients of the Order of Friendship of Peoples
Recipients of the Order of Honour (Russia)
Recipients of the Order of the Red Banner of Labour